Yury Ivanov (born 9 July 1952) is a Soviet ski jumper. He competed in the normal hill and large hill events at the 1980 Winter Olympics.

References

External links
 

1952 births
Living people
Soviet male ski jumpers
Olympic ski jumpers of the Soviet Union
Ski jumpers at the 1980 Winter Olympics
People from Sortavala
Sportspeople from the Republic of Karelia